Saint Florus (died  389) was the legendary first bishop of Lodève. He evangelised in Languedoc and the Auvergne, and was martyred in about 389.

His historicity is dubious. The first written references only appear in the 10th century, and the first vita was added to Bernard Gui's collection of the lives of saints Speculum sanctorale in the 14th century.

His tomb was the origin of a monastery, re-founded in the 11th century by Saint Odilo of Cluny, fifth abbot of Cluny. Around this abbey there grew the town of Saint-Flour, later the seat of the diocese of the same name, of which Florus is the patron saint.

His feast is kept either on 1 June or on 4 November.

References

Further reading
 Book of Saints, 2015: St Augustine's Abbey. Aeterna Press  (online version)
 Alban Butler: Leben der Väter und Märtyrer nebst anderen vorzüglichen Heiligen, Volume 16. Müller 1825 (online version)

External links 
 Diocese of Saint-Flour: Saint Flour  
 Alleuze: Florus 
 CatholicSaints.info: Saint Florus of Lodève

389 deaths
4th-century Christian saints
Gallo-Roman saints
4th-century bishops in Gaul
Legendary French people